Exo 90:2014 is a South Korean reality TV show starring Exo and members of NCT. The show was aired on Mnet.

The first episode was aired on August 15, 2014. The show's host is Jun Hyun-moo.

Background
Exo 90:2014 is a reality TV show where Exo members film music videos of the most popular K-pop songs in the 1990s & early 2000s.

The 90s K-pop idols get to visit Exo and discuss music with them.

Members of the boy band NCT (then-known under the name SM Rookies) also get to participate in the music videos and also perform live in the show.

Episodes

Music videos remake

References

South Korean reality television series
K-pop television series
Exo
Television series by SM C&C